Aistė Smilgevičiūtė (born 29 October 1977) is a Lithuanian singer. She performs folk music, jazz, pop rock and other kinds of alternative music. Since 1996, Smilgevičiūtė has been a member of the music band "Skylė".

Smilgevičiūtė was born in Plungė, and graduated in Classical Philology from Vilnius University.

Smilgevičiūtė participated as a Lithuanian contestant in the Eurovision Song Contest 1999, held in Israel, singing a modern folk song, "Strazdas" ("Song Thrush"), in the Samogitian dialect. This song finished in 20th place in the competition, with 13 points.

Discography
Aistė po vandeniu (Aistė Under Water, 1996)
Sakmė apie laumę Martyną (Tale About Pixie Martyna, 1996)
Strazdas (Thrush, 1999, single)
Tavo žvaigždė (Your Star, 2000, single)
Babilonas (Babylon, 2000)
Užupio himnas (Hymn of Užupis, 2001)
Nepamirštoms žvaigždėms (To Unforgotten Stars, 2003)
Povandeninės kronikos (Underwater Chronicles, 2007)
Sapnų trofėjai (Trophies of Dreams, 2009)
Broliai (Brothers, 2010)
Vilko Vartai (Gates of the Wolf, 2015)
Dūšelės (2016)

References

External links

"Skylė" band's website

1977 births
Living people
Eurovision Song Contest entrants of 1999
Eurovision Song Contest entrants for Lithuania
21st-century Lithuanian women singers
Lithuanian folk musicians
20th-century Lithuanian women singers
People from Plungė
Vilnius University alumni